Lake Shore Public Schools is one of three school districts in St. Clair Shores, Michigan, USA.  Lake Shore is the further North than the South Lake and Lakeview districts. Lake Shore is home to K-12 students attending three elementary schools, one middle school and one high school. The district's curriculum is fully aligned with state standards and benchmarks.

Schools

Secondary schools
Lake Shore High School
North Lake High School (alternative high school)
Kennedy Middle School

Primary schools
Masonic Heights Elementary School
Rodgers Elementary School
Violet Elementary School

Premises
All Lake Shore Public School buildings have been completely remodeled, equipped, and technologically upgraded. The most recent renovations made use of a $35 million bond issue approved in by voters in May 2016. All carpet in Kennedy Middle School was replaced, and a new HVAC system with air conditioning was going installed, along with new electrical infrastructure to support the one-to-one initiative. Asbestos tile from under the carpet was removed too.

Kennedy Middle School will have an upgraded full-service kitchen, enabling it to cook meals for middle school students rather than warming up meals from Lake Shore High School.  Partitions in the gym will be replaced with curtains.

Accreditation
Lake Shore High School is accredited by the North Central Association of Colleges and Schools, having met NCA standards for quality education. Lake Shore district in Macomb County is recognized by Standard and Poor's for having higher-than-expected student achievement for the amount of money spent to educate students between 1997 and 2001.

Certification
Lake Shore is certified by the Student and Exchange Visitor Program (SEVP) and Student and Exchange Visitor Information System (SEVIS) to accept students from around the world. In 2011, Lake Shore renovated one of their buildings to create the Taylor International School & Dormitory to house foreign exchange students and teachers.

In the 2010–2011 school year, all grades except seventh (math and writing) and sixth grade(math) have achieved higher than average M.E.A.P. scores. All Lake Shore Schools made Adequate Yearly Progress in 2011.

In the Spring of 2015, the state of Michigan replaced the MEAP with the M-STEP.  M-STEP is now Michigan's state assessment. Students will be tested on content learned in the current school year; testing occurs in the spring. Students in Lake Shore schools will take an online version of the M-STEP.

History

The Lake Shore School district is the oldest of the three public school districts in St. Clair Shores. It is believed that the first public school in the township was established in 1838. (At that time, the St. Clair Shores area was named Orange township.)

International student center
Through an agreement with Beijing Haidian Foreign Language Experimental School, a private school in China, the school district hosts Chinese foreign exchange students. In 2011 the private school and school district signed an agreement to work solely with each other lasting 21 years. In 2012 there were 70 Chinese students enrolled at Lake Shore High School. The district charges $13,000 per year for each Chinese student, with $8,411 funding tuition and about $4,000 for other expenses such as busing, lunches at school, field trips, and housing.

The Taylor Building International School and Dorm is used for after school Chinese curriculum classes taught by teachers from Beijing and a dormitory. The dormitory includes motion sensors used at night to separate boys and girls; the private school requested that these sensors be put in place. The Taylor building is a former elementary school that had been last renovated in the 1970s. The district spent $640,000 to convert and renovate the building.

References

St. Clair Shores Historical Commission. St. Clair Shores Village on the Lake. Charleston SC: Arcadia Publishing, 2001. Print.

External links

Education in Macomb County, Michigan
School districts in Michigan
1838 establishments in Michigan
School districts established in 1838
Public boarding schools in the United States